HVX may refer to:

Hexagon Vector eXtensions (HVX), Digital Signal Processor (DSP) extensions for Qualcomm Hexagon DSP
Hosta virus X, a contagious disease affecting hosta plants
 Panasonic AG-HVX200, a digital video camera